Malabo (formerly Santa Isabel) is the capital of Equatorial Guinea and the province of Bioko Norte. It is located on the north coast of the island of Bioko (and as Fernando Pó by the Europeans). In 2018, the city had a population of approximately 297,000 inhabitants.

Spanish is the official language of the city and of the country as well, but Pichinglis is used as a language of wider communication across Bioko island, including Malabo. 

Malabo is the oldest city in Equatorial Guinea. Ciudad de la Paz is a planned community under construction in mainland Equatorial Guinea which was designed to replace Malabo as the capital. The institutions of governance of Equatorial Guinea began the process of locating to Ciudad de la Paz in February 2017.

History

European discovery and Portuguese occupation

In 1472, in an attempt to find a new route to India, the Portuguese navigator Fernão do Pó,  encountered the island of Bioko, which he called Formosa. Later, the island was named after its discoverer, Fernando Pó. At the beginning of the 16th century, specifically in 1507, the Portuguese Ramos de Esquivel made a first attempt at colonization on the island of Fernando Pó. He established a factory in Concepción (now Riaba) and developed plantations of sugarcane.

With the treaties of San Ildefonso in 1777 and El Pardo in 1778, during the reign of the Spanish King Charles III, the Portuguese gave to the Spanish the islands of Fernando Pó, Annobón, and the right to conduct trade in the mainland, an area of influence of approximately 800 000 km2 in Africa, in exchange for the Colonia del Sacramento in Río de la Plata and the Santa Catalina Island off the Brazilian coast (occupied by the Spaniards). The area stretched from the Niger Delta to the mouth of Ogooué River — in current Gabon — and included, besides the islands of Fernando Pó and Annobón, the islets of Corisco and Elobeyes. Having failed its attempts to colonize these lands because they already had vast colonies in other parts of the world, Spain lost interest in Spanish Guinea in 1827 and authorized the British to use the island as a base for suppressing the slave trade.

British presence
In 1821, the British captain Nelly approached the island of Fernando Pó. He found it abandoned and founded the establishments of Melville Bay (now Riaba) and San Carlos (now Luba). Some years later, another British captain, William Fitzwilliam Owen, decided to colonize the island and in the north of it — on the site of the present capital — erected a base for British ships hunting slave traders. Thus, on 25 December 1827, Port Clarence was founded on the ruins of a previous Portuguese settlement.The name was chosen in honor of the Duke of Clarence, who later became King William IV. The Bubis indigenous to the island called it Ripotó (place of the foreigners). The population of the capital was increased by the arrival of slaves freed by the British. These freedmen were settled in Port Clarence before the establishment of Sierra Leone as a colony for freed slaves. The descendants of these freed slaves remained on the island. They joined other migrants who arrived as free workers from Liberia, Sierra Leone, Ghana, Ivory Coast, Benin, Nigeria and Cameroon, and became the population group called Creole or fernandinos, whose language was Pichinglis, a Bantu-English Creole with some Spanish elements.

During the British period, the British consul automatically became the governor of the colony, including Governor John Beecroft, a British mulatto  who modernized the capital, and whose work was later recognized by Spain with a monument in Punta Fernanda.

Spanish definitive control and new capital 
In 1844, when Queen Isabella II of Spain ruled after the regency of her mother Maria Cristina and Baldomero Espartero, in an attempt to modernize Spain and rescue its heritage, Spain let the UK know its desire to regain control of the colony and thus the island. It took another decade to implement this direct control. The capital already had more dynamic and Protestant religious missions which were very successful. Both factors helped to change the attitude of Spain, in addition to internal reasons already alluded.

Spain again took control of the island in 1855 and the capital, Port Clarence, was renamed Santa Isabel, in honor of Queen Isabella II.The capital of the island of Fernando Pó became the capital of Equatorial Guinea.

Its present name was given to the town in 1973 as part of the campaign of President Francisco Macías Nguema to replace place names of European origin with African names, in this case honoring Malabo Löpèlo Mëlaka, the last Bubi king. Malabo, the son of King Moka, surrendered to the Spaniards. His uncle Sas Ebuera, head of the Bubi warriors, claimed to represent legitimate Bubi rule and continued resisting, confronting the Spanish openly in 1898. After the Spanish killed Sas Ebuera, Malabo became the king unopposed, but with no authority. Bubi clans and settlements were slow to accept Spanish sovereignty over the island, and the full conquest and pacification of the island was not achieved until 1912.

Reign of Terror
During the so-called Reign of Terror of Macías Nguema, the dictator suppressed much of the intelligentsia of the country, initiating the process of taking over the positions of the public administration by part of the natives of Mongomo and clan Esangui. Many city residents had to leave. In the last years of his mandate, almost a fifth of the population fled. At that time (1968–1979), Equatorial Guinea received money from the Soviet Union in return for, inter alia, affording port facilities for Soviet naval craft, particularly submarines.

The infamous Black Beach prison, also known as Blay Beach prison (or Playa Negra prison), sits at the mouth of the Cónsul River, beside the black beach and behind the Governor's Palace and barracks. Several people have been jailed there during the 35 years of dictatorship. Among those imprisoned and tortured are many political leaders such as Rafael Upiñalo (Movimiento), Fabián Nsue (UP), Felipe Ondo Obiang (FDR), Martín Puye of Movement for the Self-Determination of Bioko Island (MAIB) or Plácido Micó Abogo of the Social Democratic Convergence for Social Democracy (CPDS).

A group of mercenaries was also jailed at Black Beach for an attempted coup against President Teodoro Obiang Nguema Mbasogo.

Geography 

Malabo is situated in the north of the island of Bioko, at coordinates 3° 45' 7.43" North and 8° 46' 25.32" East. The south of Malabo is limited by the Cónsul River and just across the river, south-west, is the hospital. West of the city, located about 9 km from the center of Malabo, is renewed Malabo International Airport. In the coastal region north of the city are the bays and capes. The elder is the punta de la Unidad Africana located just behind the Malabo Government Building and which occupies the entire eastern part of the Bay of Malabo. Another cape of importance is punta Europa located in the west of the city near to the airport.

Climate
Malabo features a tropical monsoon climate (Köppen Am). Malabo receives on average  of rain per year. The city has a pronounced, albeit short, sunnier (but still cloudy) dry season from December through February. It also has a very long cloudy wet season that covers the remaining nine months from March to November. On average, the months hit hardest by the wet season are September and October, which receive  of rain and showers between them.

Daytime temperatures do not vary at all day to day, and only vary a few degrees throughout the entire year. Nonetheless, with only 1,020 hours of sunshine per year, Malabo is one of the cloudiest, wettest and most lightning-prone capitals of the world, and experiences much fog and haze even when it's not raining in the driest months.

Administration 
The mayor is María Coloma Edjang Mbengono who establishes the municipal services prescribed by law, which are the responsibility of the municipality. These include drinking water and others public sources, lighting, paving of roads, cemeteries, cleaning and sanitation, the sanitary waste treatment and waste, disinfecting, emergency first aid, health inspections and drinks, health inspection of poor housing, public banks, slaughterhouses, markets and the elimination of stagnant water.

Mayors since 1960

Cultural centres
Through the Spanish Agency for International Cooperation for Development (AECID), are made several development projects at both regional and national level. Headquartered in the Technical Cooperation Office in Malabo (created in 1984), carried out actions for the development of the culture, health, education and institutional strengthening. Stressing the Cultural Center of Spain in Malabo (CCEM), founded in 2003, where young people are encouraged to feel a cultural space where they can unleash their creative freedom. It also has three geographical axes, in order to capture the largest number of people in the region and contribute to its development. Activities include the training, art, film, theater, music and games, with the two main festivals: Traveling Film Festival of Equatorial Guinea (FECIGE) and the International Festival of Hip Hop in Malabo.

Another important center is the Hispano-Guinean Cultural Center, from 2012 Equatorial Guinean Cultural Center began as headquarters of Institute Cardinal Cisneros, and then archive, museum and library. It was built in the 1950s.

The Museum of Modern Art Equatorial Guinea has traditional and contemporary art of the country and the continent. The city also hosts the National Library, built in 1916.

Tourism 

The tourism sector is seeing significant expansion. Since the discovery of oil, numerous infrastructural developments have been made. The city of Malabo is a focal point for tourism in Equatorial Guinea, due to its direct connections with major tourist attractions on the island of Bioko. Nearby tourist attractions include the following: 

 San Antonio de Ureca: A small town located in the south of the island rich in primates, birds, beaches, and waterfalls. During the months of November to February, it is possible to observe the spawning of leatherback sea turtles during the night.
 Ilachi or Iladyi Waterfalls: They are the largest waterfalls in the country with more than 250 meters of fall. They are approximately a 45-minute walk from the city of Moka.
 Pico Basilé: The highest mountain in Equatorial Guinea, it belongs to the volcanic shield next to Mount Cameroon and to the great caldera of Luba. A church and statue of Mother Bisila is located atop the mountain. The sculpture was created by the Spanish sculptor Modesto Gené Roig in 1968.
 The luxury resort of Sipopo, which was first built for the 2011 African Union Summit.

Demographics 

Malabo has a relatively young population. Approximately 45% of the population is under 15. Only about 4% of the population is more than 65 years old. Most of the population lives in rural areas of the island.

Economy 

Malabo is the commercial and financial center. Malabo's economy is based on the administration and other services. Trade is also one of the most prominent and important economic activities, especially since the arrival of US companies which exploit oil wells close to the coast. This trade also comes from the presence of other Americans, Mexicans, Nigerians, Cameroonians, Spanish and other Central Africans; The building that was originally built by the Banco Popular Español, but after independence became the seat of Banco de Guinea Ecuatorial.

The main industry in the city is fishing, while cacao and coffee are the main products of export.

Malabo has a high-tonnage port, connected mainly with the ports of Douala, (Cameroon) and Bata, and an air link via an international airport.

There are about 300 hotel beds in the city.

Education 
The National University of Equatorial Guinea (UNGE) and the National Distance Education University (UNED), the latter Spanish-language, have headquarters in the city. The Colegio Nacional Enrique Nvó Okenve, another of the country's universities, has one of its two campuses in the city.

International schools:
 Colegio Español Don Bosco
 Lycée Français de Malabo
 Equatorial Guinea Turkish International College
 Royal International College

Attractions

Malabo has preserved buildings from the colonial era, such as the Presidential Palace and the Palace of Justice of Malabo. Other colonial buildings are also found downtown, although they are worn; for example the wooden 19th-century buildings on Nigeria and Rey Boncoro streets.

Notable buildings include the Cathedral of Santa Isabel, of the Roman Catholic Archdiocese of Malabo. It is a church in the Gothic Revival style, built between 1897 and 1916. Its architect was Luis Segarra Llairadó, paid by contributions from the government of Spain and the donations of the faithful. It has two spires 40 meters high. In January 2020 a fire due to an electrical failure caused the calcination of part of its structure, currently there are work ongoing for an early restoration in November 2021. 

Other points of interest are La Gaditana, known as Finca Amilivia prior to 1918, the casa Teodolita, built in 1902 and one of the oldest homes in the city, the City Hall building in Malabo, the Church of Elá Nguema, Independence Square, the Casa de España and the bay of the harbor.

Transport

Public transport system
Public buses make the journey between downtown Malabo and the neighborhood of Ela Nguema. Taxis circulate in the city and outlying areas, and there is car hire from  Avis and Europcar.

Maritime transport
The port of Malabo can theoretically reach a treatment capacity of 200,000 tons/year. The main maritime links are with national destination to Bata and international to Spain and Douala in Cameroon.

Aviation
The Malabo International Airport serves the city. It is located 7 km from the centre in Punta Europa, Bioko. It serves long-distance direct flights to Europe and some African capitals as per the list below:

 Madrid (Spain): Ceiba Intercontinental (4 flights per week)
 Paris (France): Air France (3 flights per week)
 Frankfurt (Germany): Lufthansa (3 flights per week)
 Casablanca (Morocco): Royal Air Maroc (2 flights per week)
 Istanbul (Turkey): Turkish Airlines (1 flight per week)
 Cotonou (Benin): Cronos Airlines (2 flights per week)
 Abidjan (Ivory Coast): Ceiba Intercontinental (3 flights per week)
 Accra (Ghana): Ceiba Intercontinental (3 flights per week);
 São Tomé (São Tomé and Príncipe): Ceiba Intercontinental (3 flights per week);
 Douala (Cameroon): Ethiopian Airline (3 flights per week); Cronos Airlines (3 flights per week)
 Libreville (Gabon): Royal Air Marroc (2 flights per week)
 Port Harcourt (Nigeria): Cronos Airlines (2 flights per week)
 Addis Ababa (Ethiopia): Ethiopian Airlines (3 flights per week)

From Malabo airport, one can fly to any of the other airports in the country. These airports are located in the region of Annobón, Bata, Mongomoyen, and Corisco.

Places of worship 
Among the places of worship, they are predominantly Christian churches and temples (Catholic: Roman Catholic Archdiocese of Malabo, Protestant, Evangelical Christian: Assemblies of God). Malabo Mosque was established in 2015.

Sports 
The main sports facility of Malabo, and the country, is the Estadio de Malabo, with a capacity of 15,250 spectators. The stadium is home to the Equatorial Guinea national football team and hosted matches during the 2012 Africa Cup of Nations.  Notably, the Spain national football team, at the time World Champions, played a friendly at this stadium. The stadium also is home to the CD Elá Nguema, the main club of the country. Also located in Malabo is the Estadio Internacional. The Estadio Internacional has a 6,000 seat capacity. The Equatorial Guinea national football team played here until the Nuevo Estadio was opened.

The 2012 Africa Cup of Nations was organized jointly by Gabon and Equatorial Guinea.  One of the four venues for the tournament was the Estadio de Malabo, the main stadium of the country, constructed in 2007. In Malabo were disputed six matches of the group stage (one match of Group A and five of group B), and one cross of quarterfinals

The 16 November 2013, the Spain national football team played a friendly match against the Equatorial Guinea national football team. It was the first visit of a European team in the country, and the match was criticized by several organizations, including the president of the Liga Nacional de Fútbol Profesional, Javier Tebas, due to the political situation of the country and the government of Teodoro Obiang Nguema Mbasogo.

Some of the top clubs in the country, who have won several times the Equatoguinean Primera División are from the city of Malabo. The club with the most league titles is the CD Elá Nguema with 14. Other clubs from the city that have been proclaimed league champions are the Renacimiento FC, the Atlético Malabo or Cafe Bank Sportif. Another club of the city is the Atlético Semu, once champion of Equatoguinean Cup.

Another important club from the city is the Malabo Kings of basketball, which was champion of the country, and in 2013 was proclaimed champion Central Zone of Africa Basketball Championship, winning in Kinshasa at Talia from Gabon. The Malabo Kings had already finished second in 2011, Yaoundé (Cameroon). In 2013 held in Malabo on I Campus of Basketball Ciudad de Malabo organized by the Equatorial Guinea Basketball Federation and Club de Baloncesto Conejero from Spain.

Malabo was originally to host the 2019 African Games but due to economic problems they decide to withdraw its hosting rights and was replaced by Casablanca, Morocco.

Discovery of oil

Malabo has been significantly affected by Teodoro Obiang Nguema Mbasogo's growing co-operation with the petroleum industry.  The country's production has reached  , an increase which led to a doubling of the city's population, but for the vast majority, very little of that wealth has been invested in development.

International relations

Twin towns – sister cities
 Guadalajara, Mexico
  Celaya, Mexico
  Acayucan, Mexico

Gallery

References

External links

 
Bioko
Weather extremes of Earth
Populated places in Bioko Norte
Capitals in Africa
Populated coastal places in Equatorial Guinea
Populated places established in 1827
Port cities in Africa
Former British colonies and protectorates in Africa
1827 establishments in the British Empire
1827 establishments in Africa